Scott Spaven is an English rugby league footballer who currently plays for Doncaster in the Championship. His position is scrum-half but can play hooker.

Spaven made his début for Hull KR in a 4–40 defeat by Bradford Bulls on 25 April 2010.

References

1990 births
Living people
Dewsbury Rams players
Doncaster R.L.F.C. players
English rugby league players
Hull Kingston Rovers players
Rugby league halfbacks
Rugby league hookers
Rugby league players from Kingston upon Hull